Vittal Rao is the name of:

 Swami Ramdas (1884–1963), Indian spiritual teacher
 Vithal Rao (1929–2015), Ghazal singer
 Vittal Rao K. (born 1942), Tamil-language writer
 Devarakonda Vittal Rao (1947–2016), Indian politician
 Gummadi Vittal Rao popularly known as Gaddar (born 1949), Telugu balladeer and activist